The 2001 Minnesota Golden Gophers football team represented the University of Minnesota in the 2001 NCAA Division I-A football season. In their fifth year under head coach Glen Mason, the Golden Gophers compiled a 4–7 record and outscored their opponents by a combined total of 308 to 299.  The 2001 Minnesota Golden Gophers football team was not ranked in either the final USA Today/AFCA Coaches poll or Associated Press poll.

Schedule

Roster

References

Minnesota
Minnesota Golden Gophers football seasons
Minnesota Golden Gophers football